This is a list of current office holder of various fields of the Government of Bangladesh.

Constitutional Office

Parliament

Cabinet Ministers

Bureaucrats

Defence and Security

References

Government of Bangladesh